Musikvergnuegen, sometimes abbreviated to MusikV, is a music and sound design production company located in Los Angeles, California. The company name translates into English as "enjoyment of music". It was founded by Austrian-born composer Walter Werzowa.

Werzowa founded the company after achieving success with the "Intel Bong" jingle for Intel. Musikvergnuegen specializes in audio branding and has worked on campaigns for Samsung, Delta Air Lines, GM Goodwrench and LG.

Besides company jingles, the company does sound production for motion pictures, including the Wim Wenders production 8 ("Person to Person") and Minority Report.

Key people
Walter Werzowa

References

External links

 

Audio branding
Companies based in Los Angeles